A constitutional referendum was held in Venezuela on 2 December 2007 to amend 69 articles of the 1999 Constitution. Reform was needed, according to Venezuelan President Hugo Chávez, to initiate the transformation into a socialist country; detractors said he was using the reforms to become a dictator.

The referendum was narrowly defeated, giving Chávez the first and only election loss of his nine-year presidency.   University student protests and opposition from former allies helped fuel the defeat, but the referendum results and the 44% abstention rate suggest that support also waned among Chávez's traditional base of Venezuela's poor.

Proposal

On 15 August 2007, Venezuelan President Hugo Chávez proposed an amendment to 33 articles of Venezuela's 350-article Constitution. A constitutional provision allows the president, the National Assembly of Venezuela or a constituent assembly to ask for changes; reform should be approved by a national referendum. The 1999 constitution was promoted by Chávez and adopted by popular referendum. The proposed constitutional reforms were needed, according to Chávez, to complete the transition to a socialist republic and implement his socialist agenda; detractors said he was using the reforms to become a dictator. The proposal was hailed by government supporters as "the start of a new era towards socialism", but Podemos, a pro-government party, expressed disagreement and claimed Chávez was seeking lifelong power.

Venezuela's constitutional procedures require three debates before the National Assembly, to reform the constitution. The first debate was successfully held on 21 August 2007 and gave initial approval to the general purpose of the reform. During the second successful vote on 11 September 2007, the National Assembly added amendments to the original Chávez reform proposal, again angering the Podemos party, which said that the National Assembly had infringed the Constitution. The third vote on 25 October 2007 approved the proposal, enlarged from 33 articles to 69. Final parliamentary approval for the referendum was given on 2 November 2007.

The final proposal included 69 constitutional amendments to be voted on in two blocks:  33 that were originally proposed by President Chávez plus another 13 articles introduced by the National Assembly (Proposal A) and 23 more reform articles proposed by the National Assembly (Proposal B). Proposed changes included:
 abolish presidential term limits, allowing for indefinite re-election of the president (not allowed for any other political post),
 expand social security benefits to workers in the informal economy,
 end the autonomy of the central bank, giving control to the president, and place the president in charge of administering the country's international reserves,
 prohibit large land estates, while "allowing the state to provisionally occupy property slated for expropriation before a court has ruled",
 reorganize the country's administrative districts and allow the president to control elected state governors and mayors by an unelected "popular power" dependent on the presidency,
 reduce the maximum working week from 44 to 36 hours and reduce the workday from eight to six hours,
 lower the voting age from 18 to 16,
 increase the presidential term from six to seven years,
 allow the president to declare an unlimited state of emergency,
 prohibit foreign funding for political associations.
 allow public funding for political associations.
 ban discrimination based on sexual orientation.
Change the name of Caracas to "Bolivar's Cradle and Queen of the Guaraira Repano" (La Cuna de Bolivar y Reina del Guaraira Repano)

Campaign

In November 2007, demonstrations arose in Caracas, Venezuela and six other cities over the proposed constitutional changes. "Tens of thousands" of "Yes" voters marched in Caracas after the referendum had finally been approved on 2 November. A 7 November riot at the Central University of Venezuela resulted in gunfire and several injuries; footage was caught on tape. In late November 2007, just days before the referendum, tens of thousands marched in Caracas for both the "Yes" and "No" votes. An opposition politician estimated the crowd marching for the "No" vote at 160,000. Protests were largely peaceful, and only one death has been reported.

Some of Chávez's supporters expressed concerns and disagreement with his proposals to change the constitution. Many voters abstained in the vote, rather than cast a "No" vote against Chávez. The student movement played a crucial role in consolidating this position and in organizing numerous rallies. The student movement has played a large role in the Venezuelan political process, having gained a prominent position during the RCTV broadcast license expiration protests. Although the student movement is not limited to the opposition, it has been the opposition students that have gained the largest support, in part because they are not officially affiliated with any political cadres. The student movement was later awarded the $500,000 Milton Friedman Liberty Prize by the American Cato Institute for its role in opposing the reforms.

Raúl Baduel, former Minister of Defense and one of the four founding members of Chávez's Revolutionary Bolivarian Movement-200, expressed his concern by describing the reform as "nothing less than an attempt to establish a socialist state in Venezuela ... [which] is contrary to the beliefs of Simón Bolívar and it is also contrary to human nature and the Christian view of society, because it grants the state absolute control over the people it governs". Other leaders and former Chávez supporters who distanced themselves from the proposal were Ismael García, a deputy in the National Assembly, and Ramón Martínez, governor of Sucre State. Marisabel Rodríguez, Chávez's ex-wife, called the proposed changes an attempt to achieve "an absolute concentration of power".

CIA allegations 
Venezuela's state television network broadcast coverage prior to the referendum of a memo written in Spanish, claiming it evidenced a plan by the CIA to destabilize Chávez —an allegation referred to as Operation Pliers. Chávez threatened to cut off oil exports to the United States if violence resulted from the referendum and declared at his campaign's closing that "whoever voted 'Yes' was voting for Hugo Chávez, but whoever voted 'No' was voting for George W. Bush".  The U.S. has responded by calling the allegations "ridiculous" and "a fake". Independent analysts doubt the authenticity of the document, noting both the lack of an original document in English and that "the timing of its release is strange."

Polls

Polls from November saw very close results.  In mid-November, a Hinterlaces poll found that 51% of decided voters supported the change, while Mecanálisis said 64% of decided voters would vote against reform. A poll by Keller & Asociados concluded defeat for the proposal with 45% "No" to 31% "Yes" votes; about 65% of eligible people planned to vote. A late-November poll by Datanalisis of 1,854 likely voters indicated 49% were opposed, with 39% in favor.  Reportedly, some moderate Chávez backers were likely to vote "No"; it was the first Datanalisis survey to project a loss, contrasted with earlier surveys that showed a win for Chávez "amid low turnout and despite widespread skepticism of his proposal".

Referendum

Results
The proposal was narrowly defeated, 51 to 49 percent, in the first major electoral defeat for Chávez in the nine years of his presidency. Chávez conceded defeat, saying, "I congratulate my adversaries for this victory", and "for now, we could not do it."

Source: National Electoral Council (CNE)

Response

In conceding defeat, Chávez insisted that he would "continue in the battle to build socialism". Although two days later Chavez called "victoria de mierda" (shitty victory) to the results, further saying that "but already you are covering it (the victory) in shit". Chávez conceded defeat by saying "for now, we couldn't" ("por ahora no pudimos"), echoing the phrase he used after the failure of the February 1992 Venezuelan coup d'état attempt. Manuel Rosales, a 2006 Venezuelan presidential candidate, said, "Tonight, Venezuela has won". Leopoldo López, a popular opposition mayor, said "Venezuela won today, democracy won today".

Latin American media responses included special reports that highlighted Chávez's first electoral setback in nine years and his ethical acceptance of defeat. According to a Mercosur press release, the general Latin American response was praise for the "democratic maturity" evidenced by the Venezuelan people.  Brazil's Foreign Affairs Minister, Celso Amorin, said "The president accepted the result in a very calm and elegant manner." President Felipe Calderón of Mexico said Chávez had shown " ... enormous valor to admit such results". Spain's Foreign Affairs minister, Miguel Ángel Moratinos, said that "free expression of people's sovereignty has been accepted by all sides including those who had promoted the referendum". Néstor Kirchner, Argentine President described Chávez as a "great democrat". A response characterized by Mercosur as "blunt" came from Cuban Foreign Affairs minister Felipe Perez Roque: "those who have organized plots to destabilize Venezuela, to abolish its democratically elected government and even attempt a coup against President Chávez are active and we hope that they quit and let the Venezuelan people build their future in peace".

The U.S. administration of President George W. Bush hailed the defeat as a victory for democracy. Bush said, "The Venezuelan people rejected one-man rule. They voted for democracy."  A National Security Council spokesman said, "We congratulate the people of Venezuela on their vote and their continued desire to live in freedom and democracy". A State Department Undersecretary said, "We felt that this referendum would make Chávez president for life, and that’s not ever a welcome development. In a country that wants to be a democracy, the people spoke, and the people spoke for democracy and against unlimited power."

The Organization of American States Secretary-General José Miguel Insulza called the results of the referendum an "exemplary development" on the part of the Venezuelan government and people, saying that democracy in the Americas "passed a difficult test and emerged stronger, showing clearly its consolidation." Reporters without Borders expressed hope that the result of the vote would end the "media war" in Venezuela.

The day after the referendum, financial markets were buoyed by Chávez's defeat; Venezuelan bonds rose and the stock index in Caracas surged 4%  following a year-to-date 24% decline.

Continued plans for reform 
Chávez said on 5 December that he intended to launch a second attempt to change the Constitution.  According to El Universal newspaper, he said:   Responding to George W. Bush's remarks, he said:  During a press conference with the military high command, he expressed on Venezolana de Televisión the possibility of bringing the proposal back in "the same form, transformed or simplified" in a future referendum and the creation of the Bolivarian militias by modifying the laws regarding the armed forces. He also described the opposition's victory as "full of shit" and his defeat as "full of courage, valor and dignity".

A month after the referendum was defeated, Chávez named Ramón Carrizales to replace vice-president Jorge Rodríguez, who had been blamed by many Chávez supporters for the failed referendum.

Results by state

Source: National Electoral Council (CNE)

References

External links
 
 
 

Constitutional amendments
2007
2007 elections in South America
Constitutional referendum
2007
2007 referendums
Referendums in Venezuela
Constitutions of Venezuela
Reform in Venezuela
Constitutional referendums
Bolivarian Revolution